Susan Perkins Botsford (born April 28, 1954), a native of Middletown, Ohio, was Miss America 1978.

She has been a professional singer, spokesperson, and television reporter. Susan walked in the New York Marathon with the Achilles Club (which serves disabled and senior athletes) as a guide for an 80-year-old former Marine Colonel. She has participated in many volunteer activities supporting U.S. veterans, and in 2009 she toured Iraq with two other former Miss Americas.

Perkins Botsford was selected to the panel of judges for the preliminary competition of the Miss America 2018 pageant.

Personal life
She married Alan C. Botsford Jr., the president of Benson Botsford LLC,  in May 1979. They reside in Boston, Massachusetts and Cape Cod. Together they have two children, Trip and Brooke. Brooke is married to William Sinclair.

References

Living people
Miss America winners
People from Middletown, Ohio
1954 births
Miss America Preliminary Talent winners
Miss America 1970s delegates
People from Weston, Massachusetts